A thiomalic acid or mercaptosuccinic acid is a dicarboxylic acid containing  a thiol functional group. As suggested by its name, it contains a thiol group (SH) in place of the hydroxy group (OH) in malic acid. Salts and esters are known as thiomalates.

Thiomalic acid is an intermediate in the synthesis of corrosion inhibitors, soil fumigants, active pharmaceutical ingredients, and electroplating agents.

The sodium and gold salt of thiomalic acid, sodium aurothiomalate, is used as a pharmaceutical drug for the treatment of rheumatoid arthritis.

Thiomalic acid forms the backbone of the pesticide malathion.

References

Dicarboxylic acids
Thiols